John Abbott (1821–1893) was Prime Minister of Canada, 1891–1892.

John Abbott or Abbot may also refer to:

John Abbott (actor) (1905–1996), stage name of John Kefford, British character actor
John Abbot (ca 1381-1444)
John Abbot (entomologist) (1751–1840/1), American entomologist and ornithologist
John Abbott (Newfoundland politician) (1874–1947), Newfoundland politician
John Abbot (poet) (1587/8–c. 1650), English Roman Catholic cleric and poet
John Abbott (rugby league) (born 1953), Australian rugby league footballer
John Abbott (St. John's, Newfoundland and Labrador politician), Newfoundland and Labrador provincial politician
John Abbott, a pen-name of author Evan Hunter (1926–2005)
John Abbott (1937–2011), art dealer of Abbott and Holder
John Beach Abbott (1854–1935), judge and politician in New York
John Farr Abbott (1756–1794), British barrister
John Lovejoy Abbot (1783–1814), American cleric and librarian
John Stevens Cabot Abbott (1805–1877), American author
John T. Abbott (1850–1914), United States Ambassador to Colombia, 1889–1893
John Thomas Abbott (1872–1949), English socialist activist
John White Abbott (1763–1851), English painter and surgeon 
John Abbott (The Young and the Restless), a character on the soap opera The Young and the Restless

See also 
Jack Abbott (disambiguation)
John Abbott College, Sainte-Anne-de-Bellevue, Quebec, named after the Canadian prime minister
John Abbott House, located at Abbottstown, in Adams County, Pennsylvania